Neocrangon is a genus of crustaceans belonging to the family Crangonidae.

Its native range is Northern America and Japan.

Species:

Neocrangon abyssorum 
Neocrangon communis 
Neocrangon geniculata 
Neocrangon joloensis 
Neocrangon joloensis 
Neocrangon resima 
Neocrangon sagamiensis

References

Decapod genera
Crangonidae